Danzhou or Dan Prefecture (丹州) was a zhou (prefecture) in imperial China seated in modern Yichuan County, Shaanxi, China. It existed (intermittently) from 554 until 1269, after the territory fell to the Mongols.

References
 

Prefectures of the Sui dynasty
Prefectures of the Tang dynasty
Prefectures of the Song dynasty
Prefectures of Later Tang
Prefectures of Later Liang (Five Dynasties)
Prefectures of Later Jin (Five Dynasties)
Prefectures of Later Han (Five Dynasties)
Prefectures of Later Zhou
Prefectures of the Jin dynasty (1115–1234)
Former prefectures in Shaanxi